Edward Willis Scripps (June 18, 1854 – March 12, 1926), was an American newspaper publisher and, together with his sister Ellen Browning Scripps, founder of The E. W. Scripps Company, a diversified media conglomerate, and United Press news service. It became United Press International (UPI) when International News Service (INS) merged with United Press in 1958. The E. W. Scripps School of Journalism at Ohio University is named for him.

Early life

E. W. Scripps was born and raised in Rushville, Illinois, to James Mogg Scripps from London, and Julia Adeline Osborne (third wife) from New York.

E. W., as with many businessmen of his day, went by his initials rather than writing out his first and middle name. He often signed his middle name as "Wyllis".

E. W. was a prolific consumer of whisky and cigars, according to his confidential assistant Gilson Gardner, and was said to drink a gallon (3.79 L) each day while bearing a lit cigar at all waking hours.

Newspaper career
Both E. W. and his half-sister Ellen worked with his older half-brother, James when he founded The Detroit News in 1873. E. W. started as an office boy at the paper. In 1878, with loans from his half-brothers, E. W. went on to found The Penny Press (later the Cleveland Press) in Cleveland. With financial support from sister Ellen, he went on to begin or acquire some 25 newspapers.  This was the beginning of a media empire that is now the E. W. Scripps Company.

In 1907, Scripps created United Press Associations, now United Press International (UPI), from smaller regional news services. Scripps later said "I regard my life's greatest service to the people of this country to be the creation of the United Press", to provide competition to the Associated Press.

Scripps believed in editorial independence, stating:

Later life
In 1898, he finished building a home in San Diego, where his half-sister lived nearby, thinking that the dry, warm climate would help his lifelong allergic rhinitis. He built it as a winter home to escape the cold of West Chester, (Butler County), Ohio but eventually lived there year-round, and conducted his newspaper business from the ranch. His ranch encompassed what is today the community of Scripps Ranch as well as Marine Corps Air Station Miramar.

In 1903, he and his half-sister Ellen were the founding donors of the Scripps Institution of Oceanography. Initially Scripps was reluctant to support the venture, thinking scientists could not be businesslike. However, he developed a deep friendship with the scientific director, William Emerson Ritter, and together they began to plan projects for the Institute. As the Institute started to succeed, he became an enthusiastic supporter, and took a great interest in its work.

In 1921, Scripps founded Science Service, later named the Society for Science & the Public, with the goal of keeping the public informed of scientific achievements. Scripps College is also named in honor of his half-sister, Ellen Browning Scripps, because a large part of its endowment derives from the media fortune they had built.

Scripps died at the age of 71 on March 12, 1926, onboard his yacht Ohio as it lay anchored in Monrovia Bay, Liberia. Among his descendants was Samuel H. Scripps (1927 – 2007), grandson, who became a leading philanthropist for theater and dance in America in the late 20th century.

See also
 Samuel H. Scripps – E. W. Scripps' grandson, a philanthropist in theater and dance
 The Day Book – E. W. Scripps' six year experiment in ad-free journalism

References

Further reading
 E. W. Scripps (Harcourt, Brace and Company, 1933) by Negley D. Cochran
 E. W. Scripps and the Business of Newspapers (1999) by Gerald J. Baldasty. .
 Science Service as one Expression of E. W. Scripps's Philosophy of Life. (Washington, D.C.: Science Service, 1926) by William E. Ritter
 "Newspaper Man", Time, March 22, 1926
 Molly McClain, "The Scripps Family's San Diego Experiment," The Journal of San Diego History 56, nos. 1–2 (2010).
Molly McClain, Ellen Browning Scripps: New Money and American Philanthropy (Lincoln, NE: University of Nebraska Press, 2017)

Archives 

 E. W. Scripps Papers, Mahn Center for Archives & Special Collections, Ohio University Libraries, Athens, Ohio. Manuscript collection, primarily correspondence.

 Robert E. Burke Collection. 1892-1994. 60.43 cubic feet (68 boxes plus two oversize folders and one oversize vertical file). Contains material collected by Burke on E.W. Scripps from 1910-1994. At the Labor Archives of Washington, University of Washington Libraries Special Collections.

External links
 "How Scripps Institution Came To San Diego", The Journal of San Diego History 27:3 (Summer 1981) by Elizabeth N. Shor

Scripps, Edward Willis
Scripps, Edward Willis
Scripps, Edward Willis
Scripps, Edward Willis
News agency founders
Scripps Edward Willis
Scripps Edward Willis
Society for Science & the Public
E.W.
The Detroit News people
American newspaper chain founders
People from Rushville, Illinois
People from West Chester, Butler County, Ohio